is a 2013 Japanese film directed by and starring Dean Fujioka in the title role. The film was released in Japan on 9 November 2013. Based on the book Until I was Arrested by Tatsuya Ichihashi, the film portrays the two and a half years in which Ichihashi remained on the run following the murder of Lindsay Hawker in March 2007 until his arrest in November 2009.

Cast
 Dean Fujioka as Tatsuya Ichihashi
 Takashi Nishina
 Shinichi Tsuha
 Cozy Sueyoshi

The theme song, "My Dimension", is also sung by Dean Fujioka.

Production
The family of the deceased Lindsay Ann Hawker were not contacted by the producers during the filming of the movie, and Ichihashi refused to meet with Fujioka before filming started. The production company has no plans to donate profits from the film to the Hawker family, as they have already refused to accept royalties from Ichihashi's book.

References

External links
 

 I am Ichihashi at the Film Catalogue

2013 films
2010s Japanese films